Qarabulaq (also, Karabulag and Karabulak) is a village and municipality in the Oghuz Rayon of Azerbaijan.  It has a population of 739.

References 

Populated places in Oghuz District